Iva Shepard (April 23, 1886, Cincinnati, Ohio – January 26, 1973, Arcadia, California) was an American silent film actress. Her most notable film roles were in The Romance of an Actor (1914) and as Zoe Trevor in The Haunted Manor (1916) and as Nettie Lea in The Isle of Love (1916).

Late in her career, she made guest appearances in two 1955 episodes of the hit TV show I Love Lucy: "Nursery School" and "Don Juan and the Starlets", as a nurse and maid, respectively. These two roles provided fans who remembered her a chance to hear her voice for what may have been the first time, since she did not appear in films after 1918.

Partial filmography

 The Street of Seven Stars (1918) .... Le Grande
 The Isle of Love (1916) .... Nettie Lea
 The Haunted Manor (1916) .... Zoe Trevor
 I Accuse (1916) .... Alice Ward
 The Scarlet Road (1916) .... Mrs. Holbrook
 The Drifter (1916) .... Madge
 The Salamander (1916) .... Beatrice Snyder
 Bondwomen (1915) .... Belle Jordan
 The Suburban (1915) .... Alice Gordon
 His Wife's Past (1915)
 The Conspiracy (1914) (as Iva Shepherd) .... Juanita
 The Thief (1914) (as Ivy Shepherd) .... Mrs. Legardes
 The Straight Road (1914) .... Lazy Liz
 Captain Swift (1914) (as Iva Shepherd) .... Mrs. Seabrook, mother of Swift
 Northern Lights (1914) .... Florence Dunbar
 The Two Gun Man (1914)
 The Romance of an Actor (1914)
 Hand That Rules the World (1914)
 Withered Hands (1914)
 Into the Lion's Pit (1914)
 Coincidental Bridegroom (1914)
 Trust Begets Trust (1914)
 The Imp Abroad (1914)
 The Unhappy Pair (1913)
 His Own Blood (1913) .... Frank's Wife
 A Seaside Samaritan (1913)
 A Stolen Identity (1913)
 The Fight Against Evil (1913)
 Uncle Tom's Cabin (1913/I)
 While the Children Slept (1913) .... Mrs. Reid
 A Woman's Folly (1913) .... Mrs. Saunders, the Hostess
 In Slavery Days (1913)
 A Friend of the Family (1913)
 The Shrinking Rawhide (1912)
 A Broken Spur (1912)
 A Mysterious Gallant (1912)
 The Little Stowaway (1912)
 The Bandit's Mask (1912)
 A Diplomat Interrupted (1912)
 For His Pal's Sake (1911)
 The Right Name, But the Wrong Man (1911)
 Blackbeard (1911)
 The Convent of San Clemente (1911)
 The New Superintendent (1911)
 The Coquette (1911)
 Little Injin (1911)
 On Separate Paths (1911)
 The Rival Stage Lines (1911)
 A Cup of Cold Water (1911)
 It Happened in the West (1911)
 The Craven Heart (1911)
 The Novice (1911)
 Stability vs. Nobility (1911)
 The Other Fellow (1911)
 The Sergeant (1910)
 Hugo the Hunchback (1910)
 The Wife of Marcus (1910)

References

External links

 
 

1886 births
1973 deaths
Actresses from Cincinnati
American film actresses
American silent film actresses
20th-century American actresses